Paul Crête (born April 8, 1953) is a Canadian politician, who served as a Member of Parliament for the Bloc Québécois in the House of Commons of Canada from 1993 until 2009, when he announced that he was moving to provincial politics.

Political career
Crête was born in Hérouxville, Quebec. Prior to his political career, he was a school administrator. Crête was first elected in 1993 representing Kamouraska—Rivière-du-Loup in the 1993 Canadian federal election, then re-elected in 1997 representing Kamouraska—Rivière-du-Loup—Témiscouata—Les Basques defeating former Quebec MNA France Dionne in a hotly contested five way race.

Crête was re-elected in the 2000 election and again in 2004 election for Rivière-du-Loup—Montmagny.

In May 2009, he resigned from the House of Commons to run for the Parti Québécois in the June 22 provincial by-election in Rivière-du-Loup. He lost to Liberal candidate Jean D'Amour.

Critic

 Rural Solidarity 	( - 1998)
 Pension Reform 	( - 1998)
 Transport 	( - 1998)
 Human Resources Development 	(January 1, 1997 - June 26, 2002)
 Children and Youth 	(2002 - June 26, 2002)
 Industry (2002–2009)

House of Commons Committees

Vice-Chair

 Standing Committee on Industry, Natural Resources, Science and Technology 	38th Parliament, 1st Session

Member

 Standing Committee on Human Resources Development and the Status of Persons with Disabilities 	36th Parliament, 1st Session
 Subcommittee on Agenda and Procedure of the Standing Committee on Human Resources Development and the Status of Persons with Disabilities, 36th Parliament, 1st Session
 Standing Committee on Human Resources Development and the Status of Persons with Disabilities, 36th Parliament, 2nd Session
 Subcommittee on Agenda and Procedure of the Standing Committee on Human Resources Development and the Status of Persons with Disabilities, 36th Parliament, 2nd Session
 Standing Committee on Human Resources Development and the Status of Persons with Disabilities, 37th Parliament, 1st Session
 Subcommittee on Agenda and Procedure of the Standing Committee on Human Resources Development and the Status of Persons with Disabilities, 37th Parliament, 1st Session
 Subcommittee on Agenda and Procedure of the Standing Committee on Human Resources Development and the Status of Persons with Disabilities, 37th Parliament, 1st Session
 Standing Committee on Industry, Science and Technology, 37th Parliament, 2nd Session
 Subcommittee on Agenda and Procedure of the Standing Committee on Industry, Science and Technology, 37th Parliament, 2nd Session
 Standing Committee on Industry, Science and Technology, 37th Parliament, 3rd Session
 Subcommittee on Agenda and Procedure of the Standing Committee on Industry, Science and Technology, 37th Parliament, 3rd Session
 Standing Committee on Industry, Natural Resources, Science and Technology, 38th Parliament, 1st Session

References

External links
 
How'd They Vote?: Paul Crête's voting history and quotes

1953 births
Bloc Québécois MPs
Canadian educators
French Quebecers
Living people
Members of the House of Commons of Canada from Quebec
People from Mauricie
People from Rivière-du-Loup
Parti Québécois candidates in Quebec provincial elections
21st-century Canadian politicians
Université Laval alumni